"Release Me" is a song written and performed by American pop group Wilson Phillips, released as the second single from their debut album, Wilson Phillips (1990). The song reached number one on the US Billboard Hot 100 in September 1990 and spent two weeks at number one. It also topped the Billboard Hot Adult Contemporary chart for one week and reached number one in Canada the same month.

Track listings
US cassette single and UK 7-inch single

UK 12-inch single

UK CD single

European maxi-CD single

Charts

Weekly charts

Year-end charts

Decade-end charts

Certifications

Release history

References

1990 singles
1990 songs
Billboard Hot 100 number-one singles
RPM Top Singles number-one singles
SBK Records singles
Song recordings produced by Glen Ballard
Wilson Phillips songs